Askol-e Sofla (also Romanized as Askol-e Soflá and Askol-e Khwaru; also known as Askol-e Pā’īn) is a village in Zarivar Rural District, in the Central District of Marivan County, Kurdistan Province, Iran. At the 2006 census, its population was 616, in 134 families. The village is populated by Kurds.

References 

Towns and villages in Marivan County
Kurdish settlements in Kurdistan Province